Dhanpalthan is a Gaupalika (rural municipality) located at Morang district. Dadarbairiya, Sorabhag, Amaibariyati, Kadamaha and Nocha VDCs were incorporated into Dhanpalthan Gaupalika. This rural municipality has an area of 70.26 km2. The population as of 2017 is 39,394. The current VDC Office of Sorabhag is the office of this Gaupalika.

References

 
Rural municipalities of Nepal established in 2017
Rural municipalities in Koshi Province
Rural municipalities in Morang District